Jamtamót was the parliamentary assembly of Jämtland, a historical province (landskap) in the center of modern-day Sweden in northern Europe. Founded in the first half of the 10th century, it was one of the oldest elected assemblies in the world. All male inhabitants of Jämtland province were allowed to attend, making the gathered congregation rather large compared to the Jämtland population. Jamtamót was held annually the week of March 12, during the week of motsveckan, Jämtland's biggest market.

Etymology
Unlike other Scandinavian assemblies, it is referred to as a mót, not þing, both meaning 'assembly'. The word mót is found in e.g. the political institution Witenagemot in Anglo-Saxon England.

Function
The Jamtamót was the highest authority in Jämtland during the time it was most prominent. Disputes were settled and judgments given in criminal cases. In addition the assembly worked as a kind of government in relation to other Scandinavian lagting areas, as the council decided on tax issues. The Jamtamót initially had no king over it, and hence Jämtland in the period before 1178 is regarded as a peasant republic. All free men had to participate, and the most prominent men in the different families deliberated and jointly discussed various issues concerning the country. Decisions on important matters were taken, enhanced by asking and informing everyone assembled. There are theories that the Jamtamót decided to turn Jämtland to Christianity during the 1000s, shortly after the Battle of Stiklestad.

History
There is some evidence that the population of Viking Age Scandinavia strived to reproduce the “ideal assembly site”, described in Eddic poetry.

The Jamtamót continued to operate after falling under Norwegian control with the loss at the Battle of Storsjön in 1178. Even when Norway was centralized, the Jamtamót continued. When the Kalmar Union was formed, and Jämtland ended up far from the central power, the althing again increased its significance. In the late 15th century the Jamtamót was a Norwegian Legislative Assembly. It lost its status as a judicial body but was not abolished, and Jämtland came to have two parallel assemblies.

In the 16th century, Jämtland became a Danish county. After the Swedish occupation of Jämtland in the Northern Seven Years' War (1564-1570), King Christian IV forbade the Denmark assembly, but it continued to exist in secret and in the protection of the market week.

After Jämtland became Swedish in 1645, parts of the Jamtamót were transferred to a Swedish rural summer assembly called Jämtland landsjämnadsting. During the last half of the 19th century, the Jämtland landsjämnadsting was the only existing county council in Sweden. The 1862 municipal ordinances resulted in the creation of counties throughout all Swedish provinces. The only difference in Jämtland was that it now also included representatives from Härjedalens parishes in the county. The Jämtland County Council is therefore the only county in Sweden with a continuity from its roots as a medieval Germanic general assembly.

Jamtamot in the present
There is an unbroken link between today's Jämtland County Council and the medieval althing from the time the Jämtland operated independently, without any king. Jämtland's population has declined since the 1950s, and the government has proposed amalgamation between Jämtland and Härjedalen.

The center partist Håkan Larsson, a former member of the Swedish parliament coming from Jämtland, is one of the most serious politicians arguing for a reestablishment of Jamtamót. On his home page where he presents his vision of Jämtland year 2052 he writes:
"Sedan dess har självstyret stärkts och i dag har länet ungefär samma självstyrande roll inom Sverige som Åland hade inom Finland redan på 1900-talets slut. Jamtamot har utvecklats till ett starkt regionalt parlament. Ett tecken på uppslutningen bakom parlamentet är att härjedalingarna numera aldrig talar om att lämna Jämtlands län för Gävleborg."

which roughly translates to:
"Since then the autonomy has become strengthened and today the county [of Jämtland] has approximately the same role of autonomy within Sweden as Åland had within Finland already in the end of the 20th century. Jamtamót has developed into a strong regional parliament. A sign of the support behind the parliament is that nowadays, the people of Härjedalen never speak about leaving the county of Jämtland for Gävleborg."

See also
 Althing
 Jämtland

References

History of Jämtland